Mara Keisling (born September 29, 1959) is an American transgender rights activist and founding executive director of the National Center for Transgender Equality. She is a trans woman who began transitioning in her early 40s. In 2003, Keisling founded the National Center for Transgender Equality to advocate for the rights of transgender people in the United States.

Early life and education
Keisling was born to William and Elaine Keisling in Scranton, Pennsylvania, as one of seven siblings. She graduated with a Bachelor of Social Science degree from the Pennsylvania State University, and did graduate work in American Government at Harvard University. She has worked for 25 years in social marketing and public opinion research, while also teaching government as an adjunct faculty member at George Mason University and Marymount University.

Activist career
After coming out as a transgender woman, Keisling moved home to Pennsylvania, where she became a transgender rights activist. She first co-chaired the Pennsylvania Gender Rights Coalition, during which time she recognized the need for a professional activist presence in Washington for transgender people. She moved back to Washington in 2002 and established the National Center for Transgender Equality in 2003.

In addition to her work as executive director of the National Center for Transgender Equality, Keisling has also served on the board of directors of LGBTQ youth group Common Roads and on the steering committee of the Statewide Pennsylvania Rights Coalition.

In recognition of her activism, Keisling has won awards from PFLAG; the Equality Forum; GayLaw; the Transgender Law Center; the Harvard Bisexual, Gay, Lesbian, Transgender and Supporters Alliance; and Out for Work, among others. In 2017, she was included on Ms. Magazine's list of "45 Feminist Women to Follow on Twitter."

National Center for Transgender Equality

During her tenure as executive director, the National Center for Transgender Equality has had numerous political victories. In 2007, Keisling and NCTE co-led "United ENDA," a coalition of over 400 LGBTQ rights organizations lobbying for a version of the Employment Non-Discrimination Act that had explicit protections for transgender individuals. Although the bill ultimately failed to pass, it was the first-ever transgender-inclusive legislation to be proposed to the U.S. Congress and yielded the first-ever Congressional hearing on transgender rights issues. Under the Obama administration, NCTE also successfully lobbied for the modification of State Department regulations, allowing transgender people to change the gender marker on their passport without necessarily having undergone genital reconstruction surgery.

In 2008, NCTE partnered with the National LGBTQ Task Force to launch the National Transgender Discrimination Survey (NTDS). Then the largest study of transgender individuals in the United States, the NTDS surveyed 6,450 transgender residents about their experiences of discrimination in areas such as employment, housing, health care, and education, among others. The findings of the NTDS have since informed public policy in the United States, such as at the Department of Housing and Urban Development, which based new housing regulations to protect LGBTQ people on the study.

In 2015, NCTE followed up the NDTS by launching the U.S. Transgender Survey (USTS), thus far the largest survey of transgender individuals in the United States. Nearly 28,000 transgender residents participated in the survey, which covered a broad range of topics pertaining to family life, health, housing, income, employment, discrimination, harassment and violence, military service, political participation, and others. In addition to the full national report, NCTE has released various breakout reports focusing on specific states.

In her capacity as executive director of NCTE, Keisling has been an oft-cited source of political commentary in mainstream American media. She has appeared as a guest on news channels such as CNN, C-SPAN, Fox News, and MSNBC. She is frequently quoted in newspapers, news magazines, and online news sources, including The New York Times, The Washington Post, The Guardian, Time, BuzzFeed, and The Huffington Post. Keisling has also published op-eds in numerous outlets, including The New York Times, Time, NBC, CNN, and The Huffington Post.

Arrest in North Carolina
In 2016, North Carolina Governor Pat McCrory signed the Public Facilities Privacy & Security Act into law, thereby eliminating anti-discrimination protections for LGBTQ people and legislating that, in government buildings, individuals may only use restrooms and changing facilities that correspond to the sex listed on their birth certificates. In an act of protest while visiting the North Carolina State Capitol to ask the governor to repeal the law, Keisling used the women's restroom in the governor's office, posting a photo of the restroom door to social media. As she recounted to BuzzFeed News, other women in the restroom did not respond negatively to her presence and a state police officer in the area took no action to prevent or reprimand her. Keisling was subsequently arrested along with other demonstrators for holding a sit-in at the North Carolina State Legislative Building.

References

External links
National Center for Transgender Equality
Twitter page
Mara Keisling on Conversations from Penn State
A Review of the National Center for Transgender Equality’s Decade of Accomplishment

1959 births
20th-century American people
20th-century American women
21st-century American people
21st-century American women
Activists from Pennsylvania
American civil rights activists
Harvard University alumni
LGBT people from Pennsylvania
American LGBT rights activists
Living people
Pennsylvania State University alumni
People from Harrisburg, Pennsylvania
People from Scranton, Pennsylvania
Transgender rights activists
Transgender women